The New York Woodwind Quintet is an ensemble-in-residence at the Juilliard School in New York City, originally appointed in 1987. At Juilliard, the members of the New York Woodwind Quintet present seminars each year for student woodwind ensembles, give regular coachings, and perform.

The quintet's current members are flutist Carol Wincenc, oboist Stephen Taylor, clarinetist Charles Neidich, bassoonist Marc Goldberg, and French horn player William Purvis,

The New York Woodwind Quintet has been performing for more than 50 years in concerts and workshops in the United States, Canada, Europe, Asia, and South America. More than 20 compositions have been written for and premiered by the quintet, some of which have become classics of the woodwind repertoire. They include quintets by Gunther Schuller, Ezra Laderman, William Bergsma, Alec Wilder, William Sydeman, Wallingford Riegger, Jon Deak and Yehudi Wyner. The Quintet has featured many of these pieces in recordings for such labels as Boston Skyline, Bridge, New World Records, and Nonesuch.

References

American classical music groups
Wind quintets
Juilliard School
Musical groups from New York City
Musical groups established in 1987
1987 establishments in New York City